Crane Bay is located on the southeast coast of Barbados, between Foul Bay and Long Bay.

Bays of Barbados